Phillip Everly (January 19, 1939 – January 3, 2014) was an American Musician, who was one half of the duo The Everly Brothers alongside his older brother Don.

Early life
Phil was born in Chicago in 1939 to Isaac Milford "Ike" Everly, Jr. (1908–1975), a guitar player, and Margaret Embry Everly (1919–2021).

The Everly family moved to Knoxville, Tennessee, in 1953, where the brothers attended West High School. In 1955, the family moved to Madison, Tennessee, while the brothers moved to Nashville. Don had graduated from high school in 1955, and Phil attended Peabody Demonstration School, from which he graduated in 1957.

Career

The Everly Brothers

The Everly Brothers Career started in 1951. They signed to Cadence Records In 1957. Their first hit was Bye Bye Love, that had been rejected by 30 other acts. 

Bye Bye Love went to no. 2 on the pop charts, behind Elvis Presley's "(Let Me Be Your) Teddy Bear", and No. 1 on the country and No. 5 on the R&B charts. The song, by Felice and Boudleaux Bryant, became the Everly Brothers' first million-seller.

The Everly Brothers are remembered for other major charting hits such as Cathy’s Clown And All I Have To Do Is Dream.

After the duo split following conflicts between the two brothers, Phil and Don pursued solo careers from 1973 to 1983. The brothers' reunited at the Royal Albert Hall in London on September 23, 1983, which ended their ten-year-long hiatus. The event was initiated by Phil and Don alongside Terry Slater, with Wingfield as musical director. This concert was recorded for a live LP and video broadcast on cable television in mid-January 1984. The brothers returned to the studio as a duo for the first time in over a decade, recording the album EB '84, produced by Dave Edmunds.

The Everly Brothers were inducted into the Rock and Roll Hall of Fame in 1986. They were the first duo and non-solo act to have been inducted. That same year, they received a star on the Hollywood walk of fame.

Their final charting single was 1986's "Born Yesterday". A 1981 live BBC recording of "All I Have to Do Is Dream", which featured Cliff Richard and Phil sharing vocals, was a UK Top 20 hit in 1994.

Paul McCartney has stated that the Everly Brothers were a major influence on the Beatles:

Solo work
Phil sang backup for Roy Wood's 1975 album Mustard and two songs for Warren Zevon's 1976 self-titled album.

While Zevon was part of Phil Everly's back-up band, Phil also suggested the title and subject matter for Zevon's breakthrough hit single "Werewolves of London".

Phil recorded more frequently, but with no chart success until the 1980s. He wrote "Don't Say You Don't Love Me No More" for the 1978 Clint Eastwood comedy film Every Which Way But Loose, in which he performed it as a duet with the film's co-star Sondra Locke. Phil also wrote "One Too Many Women In Your Life" for the 1980 sequel, Any Which Way You Can, and played in the band which backed Locke.

In 1983, Phil had UK success as a solo artist with the album Phil Everly, recorded mainly in London. Musicians on the LP included Dire Straits guitarist Mark Knopfler, Rockpile and Dire Straits drummer Terry Williams, and keyboard player Pete Wingfield. The track "She Means Nothing to Me", written and composed by John David Williams and featuring Cliff Richard as co-lead vocalist, was a UK Top 10 hit, and "Louise", written and composed by Ian Gomm, reached the Top 50 in 1983.

In 1990, Phil recorded a duet with Dutch singer René Shuman. "On Top of the World" was written and composed by Phil, who appeared in the music video they recorded in Los Angeles. The selection appeared on Shuman's album Set the Clock on Rock.
Everly stopped performing in 2007.

Personal life
Everly was married to Jacqueline Alice Ertel from 1963 to 1970, Patricia Mickey from 1972 to 1978, and Patrice Arnold from 1999, up until his death.

Phil had two children. Everly graduated from Peabody Demonstration School in 1957.

Death
Phil died in Burbank, California on January 3, 2014, sixteen days before his 75th birthday from chronic obstructive pulmonary disease (COPD). His brother Don died in August 2021, and the Everly family matriarch, Margaret Embry Everly, died four months later in December aged 102.

Phil's widow Patti blamed her husband's death on his smoking habit, which caused him to develop chronic obstructive pulmonary disease, and recounted Phil's spending his final years having to carry oxygen tanks with him wherever he went and taking 20 different types of medications per day.

Paul McCartney posted about Everly’s death on social media, stating:

Discography

Everly Brothers

Solo

Albums

Singles

References

See also
 Don Everly
 The Everly Brothers
 List of songs recorded by the Everly Brothers

1939 births
2014 deaths
Deaths from lung disease
Singers from Chicago
People from Shenandoah, Iowa
Singers from Iowa
American country singer-songwriters
Songwriters from Illinois
20th-century American male writers
21st-century American male writers
Songwriters from Iowa
Writers from Chicago
United States Marine Corps reservists
American male singer-songwriters
American male guitarists
Guitarists from Chicago
Guitarists from Iowa
20th-century American guitarists
American country guitarists
American acoustic guitarists
American rockabilly guitarists